Lee White may refer to:

 Lee White (actor) (1888–1949), American actor of the stage, screen and radio
 Lee White (American football) (born 1946), American running back
 Lee White (sailor) (born 1957), Bermudian sailor
 Lee C. White (1923–2013), American political advisor to Presidents Kennedy and Johnson

Lee James White
 H. Lee White Marine Museum, Oswego, New York
 MV H. Lee White, an American lake freighter, in service since 1974